The Detroit Public Library is the second largest library system in the U.S. state of Michigan by volumes held (after the University of Michigan Library) and the 21st-largest library system (and the fourth-largest public library system) in the United States. It is composed of the Main Library on Woodward Avenue, which houses the library's administration offices, and 23 branch locations across the city. The Main Library is part of Detroit's Cultural Center Historic District listed in the National Register of Historic Places adjacent to Wayne State University campus and across from the Detroit Institute of Arts.

Designed by Cass Gilbert, the Detroit Public Library was constructed with Vermont marble and serpentine Italian marble trim in an Italian Renaissance style. His son, Cass Gilbert, Jr. was a partner with Francis Keally in the design of the library's additional wings added in 1963. Among his other buildings, Cass Gilbert designed the United States Supreme Court Building in Washington, D.C., the Minnesota State Capitol and the Woolworth Building in New York City.

History
A stand-alone public library in Detroit dates back to 1865. An 1842 state law requiring the Detroit Board of Education to open a library resulted in a public reading room opening on March 25, 1865 in the old Capitol High School at State and Griswold Street. In 1872, the Centre Park Library opened across the street from the current location of the Skillman Branch in downtown Detroit at Gratiot and Library Street. The first branch library opened in 1897 when the Detroit Water Commission library was opened to the public; in 1905 this library was turned over to the Detroit Library Commission.

Several additional branches opened shortly afterwards, including one in the Old Main building of Wayne State University. But it was not until 1910 when Andrew Carnegie, the great American library philanthropist of the early 20th century, donated funds did Detroiters decide to build a larger central library to supplement Centre Park. Property near Woodward and Kirby was purchased and in 1912 Cass Gilbert was commissioned to construct his design of a three-floor, early Italian Renaissance-style building. Due to delays and World War I, the Main Library did not open until March 21, 1921. It was dedicated June 3, 1921. In 1937, the Detroit Public Library hired its first African-American librarian, Marjorie A. Blakistone; Blackistone worked throughout her career to expand the library's African-American literature collection. The library system's bookmobile service began in 1940.

After World War II, Detroit Public Library obtained "projected books" on microfilm and loaned these with portable projectors to disabled veterans (and other patrons with disabilities) who could press a switch under their chin more easily than turning a page.

The north and south wings opened on June 23, 1963 and added a significant amount of space to the building. The wings were connected along the rear of the original building and a new entrance created on Cass Avenue. Above this entrance is a mosaic by Millard Sheets entitled The River of Knowledge. As part of the addition, a triptych mural was added to the west wall of Adam Strohm Hall on the third floor. The mural by local artist John Stephens Coppin is entitled Man's Mobility and depicts a history of transportation. This mural complements a tryparch mural on the opposite wall completed in 1921 by Gari Melchers depicting Detroit's early history.

In 1970 Clara Stanton Jones became the first African American and the first woman to serve as director of a major library system in America, as director of the Detroit Public Library.

The Detroit Public Library is also a founding member of the Detroit area library network. The network initially ran the Integrated Library System (online library catalog) for the library, but the library later purchased its own servers, after the mainframe computer era began to wane, and the library now runs its own systems. The library continues to be a member partner in the network consortium.

Administration
The Detroit Public Library is a publicly funded, independent, municipal corporation. The Detroit Public Library Commission, whose members are appointed by the Detroit Public Schools Board of Education, is the governing authority for the system. The commission establishes policies and administers funds. There are 7 Library Commissioners, with the seventh commissioner being the current president of the Board of Education, who is an ex-officio commissioner. Library Commissioners are appointed to 6 year staggered terms. There is an annual general meeting where the president, vice president, and secretary of the commission are elected, and monthly meetings held at the Main Library which are open to the public. The commission appoints and hires the Director and Deputy Director, while all other employees are hired by the commission, upon the recommendation of the Director.

September 16, 2014, former chief administrative and technology officer Timothy Cromer was sentenced to 10 years in prison for his role in a $1.5 million kickback scheme."

Collections
The Detroit Public Library offers users books, magazines, records, CDs, videos, DVDs and electronic materials through access to subscription databases. It also houses the Burton Historical Collection (named for historian and donor Clarence M. Burton), the E. Azalia Hackley Collection (named for Emma Azalia Hackley), and the National Automotive History Collection. Additionally, there are online collections, including one on Detroit Tigers and Baseball Hall of Fame radio broadcaster Ernie Harwell. The Ernie Harwell Online Exhibit is part of the Burton Historical Collection. The Detroit Public Library Online Catalog

Services
The library also offers practical advice to Detroiters through their TIP service, short for The Information Place. Librarians and support staff have access to a TIP database and offer free community information and referral service on matters such as food, housing, transportation, financial aid, legal advice, education, counseling, health care and family support. Library clients can search the TIP database themselves when visiting the library.

Gallery

Branches

The Douglass Branch for Specialized Services is the base of operations for the bookmobile service, and it also houses the Library for the Blind and the Physically Handicapped and other special services.

The quotes on the outside of the Skillman Branch read, per side:

Gratiot Avenue : "The Fountain of Knowledge Flows Through Books"

Library Street Side: "The Wealth Of The Mind Is The Only True Wealth"

Grand River Street Side : "Religion, Knowledge, Morality"

Farmer Street Side: "Civilization is the Accumulated Culture of Mankind"

Chandler Park, in the Eastside of Detroit, is a three-story facility built in 1957. The library, which has a collection specializing in books written by African-Americans, is located on Harper Avenue, in proximity to Dickerson Street. The interior, is decorated with artwork from children living in the area and portraits of notable African-American people. In 2009 John Carlisle (Detroitblogger John) wrote in the Metro Times that most of its patrons go to the library to use its computers.

Former branches
 John S. Gray Branch
 Bernard Ginsburg Branch (Closed in 1927 and turned over to Recreation Department.)
 Gabriel Richard Branch (Was located on 9876 Grand River/Stoepel. Closed due to budget cuts on December 22, 2011)
 George Van Ness Lothrop Branch (At the southwest corner of West Warren Avenue and West Grand Boulevard-demolished October 2009)
 George Osius Branch
 Henry M. Utley Branch ( 8726 Woodward Avenue, now "The Family Place". )
 Magnus Butzel Branch (At the southwest corner of Harper Avenue (I-94 Service Road) and East Grand Boulevard; demolished in 1998)
 Mark Twain Library (Closed and Relocated to Mt. Calvary Missionary Baptist Church in 1996. Demolished October 2011)
 Mark Twain Annex (Closed due to budget cuts on December 22, 2011.  Located at 4741 Iroquois)
 George S. Hosmer Branch (Opened January 11, 1911 and closed May 30, 1932. Located at 3506 Gratiot Avenue. Purchased in 2016 and planned to be a bookstore and café.)

References

Further reading

 Cohn,Barbara Madgy and Patrice Rafail Merritt, The Detroit Public Library: An American Classic (Detroit, MI: Wayne State University Press, 2017).

External links

 Official Detroit Public Library website — ''includes a history of the Detroit Public Library and information on branches and access to the online catalogue.

 TIP (The Information Place).
Selected Cass Gilbert Architectural Drawings of the Detroit Public Library at Wayne State University Library contains 19 presentation drawings by Cass Gilbert of the Detroit Public Library, which he designed in 1921.
 The Ernie Harwell Online Exhibit.
 The Drawing Power: An Exhibit of Motor City Ad Art in the Age of Muscle and Chrome.
 The Making of Modern Michigan.

Public libraries in Michigan
Libraries in Detroit
Carnegie libraries in Michigan
Education in Detroit
Government of Detroit
Historic district contributing properties in Michigan
Michigan State Historic Sites in Wayne County, Michigan
National Register of Historic Places in Detroit
Cass Gilbert buildings
Renaissance Revival architecture in Michigan
1865 establishments in Michigan
Library buildings completed in 1921
Libraries established in 1865